Eddy Kuijpers (14 October 1914 – 12 October 1992) was a Dutch fencer. He competed in the individual and team foil and sabre events at the 1948 Summer Olympics.

References

1914 births
1992 deaths
Dutch male fencers
Olympic fencers of the Netherlands
Fencers at the 1948 Summer Olympics
Sportspeople from The Hague
20th-century Dutch people